Joanne Marie Salas Brown is a Guamanian politician. Brown serves as a Republican senator in the Guam Legislature.

Early life 
Brown was born in Guam. Brown's father is James Albert Brown. Brown's mother is Rosita Salas Brown. In 1983, Brown graduated from Notre Dame High School.

Education 
In 1987, Brown earned a Bachelor of Science degree in Political Science from University of Guam. In 1988, Brown earned a Master of Arts degree in Political Science from University of Hawaiʻi at Mānoa.

Career 
In 1989, Brown started her political career as a Staff Assistant for Governor Joseph Franklin Ada.

In March 1991, Brown was appointed as Deputy Administrator for the Guam Environmental Protection Agency.

In November 1994, Brown won the election and became a Republican senator in the Guam Legislature. Brown served her first term on January 2, 1995 in the 23rd Guam Legislature. Brown served her second term in the 24th Guam Legislature. Brown served her third term in the 25th Guam Legislature. Brown served her fourth term in the 26th Guam Legislature. Brown served her fifth term in the 27th Guam Legislature. Brown served her sixth term in the 28th Guam Legislature, until the term's end date on January 1, 2007.

In 1995, Brown became an Adjunct Instructor of Political Science at University of Guam, College of Arts and Sciences, until 2006.

In January 2011, Brown became a Director of Guam Department of Public Works, until 2012.

In December 2012, upon the resignation of Anisia B. Terlaje and planned leave of Mary C. Torres, Brown was named acting 
general manager of Port Authority of Guam. In 2012, Brown became a General Manager of Port Authority of Guam, until 2018.

On November 3, 2020, Brown a won the election and became a Republican senator in the Guam Legislature. Brown continued another term on January 4, 2021 in the 36th Guam Legislature.

See also 
 2020 Guamanian legislative election

References

External links 
 Joanne Brown at ballotpedia.org
 brown4guam.com
 Joanne M. Salas Brown at ourcampaigns.com
 Joanne M. Salas Brown at mbjguam.com

Guamanian Republicans
Guamanian women in politics
Living people
Members of the Legislature of Guam
University of Guam alumni
University of Hawaiʻi at Mānoa alumni
Year of birth missing (living people)
21st-century American women